Woodbury Township is one of eight townships in Cumberland County, Illinois, USA.  As of the 2010 census, its population was 604 and it contained 259 housing units.

Geography
Woodbury Lake is in this township.

Cities, towns, villages
 Jewett

Unincorporated towns
 Woodbury at

Cemeteries
The township contains these two cemeteries: Chezem and Jewett.

Major highways
  Interstate 70
  U.S. Route 40

Demographics

School districts
 Cumberland Community Unit School District 77
 Dieterich Community Unit School District 30

Political districts
 State House District 109
 State Senate District 55

References
 
 United States Census Bureau 2009 TIGER/Line Shapefiles
 United States National Atlas

External links
 City-Data.com
 Illinois State Archives
 Township Officials of Illinois

Adjacent townships 

Townships in Cumberland County, Illinois
Charleston–Mattoon, IL Micropolitan Statistical Area
1860 establishments in Illinois
Populated places established in 1860
Townships in Illinois